Vrana (or ) is a historic settlement located north of the Vrana Lake,  from Pakoštane, a few kilometers from the Adriatic coast, in Zadar County, Dalmatia, Croatia. Today it is a small rural settlement.

History
The significance of Vrana to the medieval Croatian history was closely connected with three religious communities: the Benedictines, the Knights Templar, and the Knights Hospitaller. The arrival of these three orders in Vrana and their cultural and political influence was conditioned by the medieval circumstances in Croatia and by the Roman Pope. Vrana had become one of the most important centers of political life, especially in the period from 1070.

After the pope's deputies crowned him as the king of Croatia, King Zvonimir Dmitar in 1076 donated the city of Vrana and Benedictine monastery of St. Gregory, as a sign of loyalty to Pope Gregory VII. Vrana was the first permanent diplomatic headquarters of the pope's deputies in the entire Slavic region. Insignia of Croatian Kingdom were held within Vrana's walls for a long time. Consequently, Coloman of Hungary in 1102 came to the coronation in Biograd, as the nearest royal residence.

In the 12th century, the church Priory of Vrana donated this property to Knights Templar. At that time, Vrana was fortified with walls and towers and a moat. There are assumptions that the present ruins of a fortified facility above the village were part of a fortified town with a church. After Knights Templars, Vrana was the property of the Knights Hospitallers from 1312.

The Ottoman Empire conquered Vrana in 1527, and it remained under their control for a century, before the Republic of Venice took it in the Candian War briefly in 1647 and Morean War finally. In October 1683, the population of Venetian Dalmatia, principally Uskoks of Ravni kotari, took arms and together with the rayah (lower class) of the Ottoman frontier regions rose up, taking Skradin, Karin, Vrana, Benkovac and Obrovac.

Attractions
 Benedictine monastery or fortress Vrana
 Vrana Lake (Vransko jezero)
 Han Jusufa Maškovića

See also
 Dmitar Zvonimir of Croatia
 John of Palisna

Notes
 The Benedictine monastery in Vrana kept the crown of Croatian kings.
 According to legend, the Croatian Knights Templar buried the great treasure in Vrana.
 In Vrana were born two famous 15th-century Croatian masters of the Renaissance: Lucijan Vranjanin (Luciano Laurana or Lucijan the builder) and sculptor Franjo Laurana Vranjanin (Francesco Laurana). From Vrana comes the great theologian Thomas Ilirik.

References

Further reading

External links
 http://hakave.org/index.php?option=com_content&task=view&id=1419&Itemid=151
 http://www.templari.hr/slike/Vrana_i_templari.pdf
 http://www.vjesnik.hr/pdf/1999%5C09%5C05%5C21A21.PDF

Populated places in Zadar County
Castles in Croatia
Archaeological sites in Croatia
Medieval sites in Croatia